Anastasia Tsichlas was a prominent football Managing Director for the Mamelodi Sundowns, a successful South African first-division club.  She and her husband Angelo came on the board of the Sundowns in 1988, Anastasia became the managing director, while Angelo became the chairman.

She has been featured in many football magazines and is a famous personality in African football due to both the success of her football team and her reputation as a ruthless manager.

She currently is a member of the FIFA organizational committee for the arrival, in 2010, of the FIFA World Cup in South Africa, as well as the FIFA Football Committee.

She has been nicknamed the "Iron Lady" by her African supporters; this honorable nickname is also due to her relentless efforts to promote women's football in Africa and the world.

Her son, Stavro Tsichlas is the current goalkeeper coach of Thanda Royal Zulu, from Richards Bay.

References

Living people
South African people of Greek descent
White South African people
Year of birth missing (living people)